MV Cape Washington (T-AKR-9961) was originally built as a commercial ship in 1982 and sold to the Grace Marine Company with the named Hual Transporter. She has a sister ship named .

Construction and career 
It served as a merchant ship until it was purchased by the US Department of Transportation, Maritime Administration on 7 April 1993. From there it was later transferred to the Maritime Administrations Ready reserve fleet and assigned to Maryland. Since then it has been activated to serve in bringing vehicles and supplies to Europe where they are air lifted to troops engaged in Iraq and Afghanistan.

Further reading
(https://web.archive.org/web/20120612073319/http://www.msc.navy.mil/inventory/ships.asp?ship=58) Military Sealift Command Ship Inventory
(http://www.navsource.org/archives/09/54/549961.htm) NavSource Online: Service Ship Photo Archive

References

Ships built in Gdynia
Gulf War ships of the United States
1981 ships